Otuquis National Park and Integrated Management Natural Area, (Parque Nacional y Área Natural de Manejo Integrado Otuquis (PN-ANMI Otuquis) or Parque Nacional y ANMI Pantanal de Otuquis), is a national park in the Pantanal ecoregion of southeastern Bolivia. It is named after the Otuke indigenous people who inhabit the region.

Geography
It is located in the extreme southeast of the Santa Cruz Department on the borders with Brazil and Paraguay, within the provinces Germán Busch and Cordillera.

Nature
This park is known for its sightings of marsh deer, capybara, spectacled caiman, caiman lizards and the yellow anaconda. Jaguars, pumas, pampas cats, ocelots, lesser anteaters and other mammals also found here in healthy populations. Otuquis National Park is popular for birders when millions of birds flock here to feed on huge schools of bait fish.

See also

List of national parks of Bolivia

External links 
 www.fundesnap.org / Parque Nacional y Área Natural de Manejo Integrado Pantanal de Otuquis (Spanish)
 www.fcbc.org.bo / Áreas Protegidas en la región del Bosque Chiquitano (Spanish)

National parks of Bolivia
Geography of Santa Cruz Department (Bolivia)
Pantanal
Protected areas established in 1997
1997 establishments in Bolivia